Richard John Grenville Spring, Baron Risby (born 24 September 1946) is a former Conservative Party politician in the United Kingdom. He served as Member of Parliament (MP) for Bury St Edmunds from 1992 to 1997, and for West Suffolk from 1997 to 2010. He joined the House of Lords in 2010 and is currently the Prime Minister’s Trade Envoy to Algeria and Lebanon.

Biography
Spring was born into the prominent Spring family, in 1946 in Cape Town, South Africa where he attended Rondebosch and Cape Town University. He subsequently studied at Magdalene College, Cambridge. He married Hon. Jane Henniker-Major, daughter of John Henniker-Major, 8th Baron Henniker, in 1979. They divorced in 1993, having had two children.

Career

Finance
Lord Risby has more than 20 years' experience in the financial sector. Following his graduation from Cambridge University, Spring started his career in the City. He joined Merrill Lynch in 1971 and was appointed as vice-president in 1976, a position which he held until 1986. He has furthermore worked with E F Hutton, Lehman Brothers and Furman Selz.

Parliament
Spring contested Ashton-under-Lyne at the 1983 general election. He was first elected as an MP at the 1992 General Election, representing Bury St Edmunds. Spring served as Parliamentary Private Secretary to Sir Patrick Mayhew as Secretary of State for Northern Ireland (1994–95).

Spring resigned from this position in 1995, after News of the World published a story detailing a sex encounter he had allegedly been involved in. The publication of the story was attacked as an example of paid entrapment, and on the grounds that it served no public interest. News of the World columnist Woodrow Wyatt, writing in The Times, stated that "[t]hat anyone is entitled to privacy in their homes, in their cups or in their beds is a wholly alien concept to the News of the World. The News of the World has as good as asked for a privacy law. The Government and Opposition should no longer hesitate to produce it". Even the News of the Worlds proprietor, Rupert Murdoch, privately criticised the story as "over the top".

Spring's resignation was seen as a blow to John Major's Back to Basics campaign.
Spring subsequently served as PPS to Tim Eggar as Minister for Trade and Industry (1995–96) and to Nicholas Soames and James Arbuthnot as Ministers of State at the Ministry of Defence (1996–97).

In 1997, Spring was elected as MP for West Suffolk. Between 1997 and 2000 he was Opposition spokesman for Culture, Media and Sport. He was Opposition Spokesman for Foreign Affairs between 2000 and 2004 and Shadow Minister for the Treasury between 2004 and 2005. On 23 November 2009, Spring announced that he would stand down at the 2010 general election.

He served as a Governor of the Westminster Foundation for Democracy from 2000 to 2009.

Between 2005 and 2010 he was a Vice-Chairman of the Conservative Party and Vice-Chairman of Conservative Business Relations as well. In 2005 he was appointed co-Chairman of Conservative City Circle and in 2007 he founded Conservative City Future, of which he is Patron with Sir John Major.

He was also Director of the British Syrian Society between 2003 and 2011, and featured on a 2012 Dispatches program on the Assad regime.

On 24 December 2010, Spring was created a life peer as Baron Risby' of Haverhill in the County of Suffolk. Lord Risby sits as a Conservative in the House of Lords.

From 2011 to 2015, Risby was the Vice-Chairman of the All-Party Parliamentary Group for East Asian Business. In November 2012, Lord Risby was announced as one of nine prime ministerial trade envoys, with responsibility for Algeria and, in 2019, Lebanon.

Lord Risby was on the EU External Affairs Committee in the Lords between 2015-2018. In 2020 to 2022 he was a member of the International Agreements Committee.

Other interests
In 1994, he chaired a parliamentary enquiry into the taxation of horseracing.

Risby is Co-Chairman of the All Party Parliamentary Group for Ukraine. In his capacity as the then Chairman of the British Ukrainian Society, he co-chaired the Scenarios for Ukraine programme for the World Economic Forum in Davos. Since May 2022 he has been on the Russian Government black list.

Risby has been a director of several businesses and organisations, including Hawkley Oil and Gas Ltd and Minexco Petroleum Inc, and was the president of the Association for Decentralised Energy. He is also the Deputy Chairman of the Small Business Bureau. In 2016, he was made a Government appointed director the Horserace Betting Levy Board.

He is a Patron of the London Magazine and of the Open Road charity, and in 2021 became chairman of the Advisory Council on Geostrategy.

In 2007, he was nominated for a British Computer Society award for accessibility. In 2009, he was awarded the Parliamentary Award for Road Safety in recognition of his community campaigning.

References

External links 
 ePolitix.com – Richard Spring MP
 Guardian Unlimited Politics – Ask Aristotle: Richard Spring MP
 Conservative Business Relations
 TheyWorkForYou.com – Richard Spring MP
 The Public Whip – Richard Spring MP voting record
 BBC News – Richard Spring – Profile
 

1946 births
Living people
Conservative Party (UK) MPs for English constituencies
UK MPs 1992–1997
UK MPs 1997–2001
UK MPs 2001–2005
UK MPs 2005–2010
Alumni of Magdalene College, Cambridge
Alumni of Rondebosch Boys' High School
Richard
Conservative Party (UK) life peers
Life peers created by Elizabeth II